Ad Mare (Latin, “To The Sea”) is the debut single album by South Korean girl group Nmixx. The single album was released by JYP Entertainment on February 22, 2022, and contains four tracks, containing lead single "O.O", B-side "Tank" (占), and instrumentals for both songs.

Background and release
On July 9, 2021, JYP Entertainment announced it would be debuting a new girl group in February 2022, the first since Itzy in 2019. On February 2, 2022, it was announced that the group would debut on February 22 with the release of Ad Mare. Six days later, the track listing was released with "O.O" announced as the lead single. On February 17, the first music video teaser for "O.O" was released. Two days later, the highlight medley video teaser was released. On February 21, the second music video teaser for "O.O" was released. The single album alongside the music video for "O.O" was released on February 22.

Composition
The lead single "O.O" was described as a song with "mixture of baile funk and teen pop rock" genres with "intense captivating trap intro". "Tank" was described as a song with "groovy vocals and unique raps" that features member Lily's "timbre and explosive treble" with lyrics that "compares the confident and ambitious attitude to a tank".

Critical reception

Tanu I. Raj from NME gave Ad Mare 2 out of 5 stars, calling it "inconsistent" and "choppy" due to the uneven transitions from electropop to pop rock to hip hop in "O.O" Although he appreciated the simpler melodies in "Tank", he concluded that the latter was not able "to alleviate the damage that 'O.O' does".

Commercial performance
Ad Mare debuted at number three on South Korea's Gaon Album Chart in the chart issue dated February 20–26, 2022; on the monthly chart, the single album debuted at number three in the chart issue for February 2022 with 161,312 copies sold.

Promotion
On February 18, 2022, JYP Entertainment announced that the group debut showcase would be postponed to March 1 after member Bae was diagnosed with COVID-19.

Track listing

Credits and personnel
Credits adapted from Melon.

Studio
 A Team Studio – recording 
 JYPE Studios – recording , vocal editing 
 Alawn Music Studios – mixing 
 Canton House Studios – mixing 
 821 Sound Mastering – mastering 
 Sterling Sound – mastering 

Personnel

 Dr.JO (153/Joombas) – lyrics 
 Oh Hyun-seon (Lalala Studio) – lyrics 
 Jung Jun-ho – lyrics 
 Oh Yu-won – lyrics 
 Dwayne Abernathy Jr. – composition 
 Ryan S. Jhun – composition, arrangement 
 Ericka J. Coulter – composition , background vocals 
 Deanna DellaCioppa – composition 
 Matthew Jaragin – composition 
 Brian U (The Hub) – composition, arrangement, drums, synths 
 Enan (The Hub) – composition, arrangement, drums, synths , 
 MarkAlong (The Hub) – composition, arrangement, drums, synths 
 Charlotte Wilson (The Hub) – composition , vocal directing 
 Chanti (The Hub) – composition 
 EJAE – composition , background vocals , vocal directing 
 Awry (The Hub) – composition , background vocals 
 Ayushy (The Hub) – composition 
 Jan Baars (The Hub) – composition 
 Rajan Muse (The Hub) – composition 
 Dem Jointz – arrangement, keyboard, drums 
 Jade – bass 
 BananaGaraG – bass 
 Paper Planet – guitar 
 TRIAD – guitar 
 Lily – background vocals 
 Frankie Day – background vocals 
 Ayushy – background vocals 
 Brian U (The Hub) – vocal directing 
 Enan (The Hub) – vocal directing 
 MJ – recording 
 Gun Hye-jin – recording 
 Lee Kyung-won – digital editing 
 Lee Sang-yeob – vocal editing 
 Jiyoung Shin NYC – vocal editing 
 Alawn – mixing 
 Jaycen Joshua – mixing 
 Jacob Richards – mixing (assistant) 
 Mike Seaberg – mixing (assistant) 
 DJ Riggins – mixing (assistant) 
 Kwon Nam-woo – mastering 
 Chris Gehringer – mastering

Charts

Weekly charts

Monthly charts

Year-end chart

Certifications

Release history

References

2022 albums
Korean-language albums
JYP Entertainment albums
Single albums
Nmixx albums